Vidya Niketan School is an English-medium school managed by the Tata Motors Employees Education Trust. It was established on 18 June 1983.

See also 
List of schools in Pune

Schools in Maharashtra
Education in Pimpri-Chinchwad
Educational institutions established in 1983
1983 establishments in Maharashtra